Grogger can refer to:
Grager, a noisemaker used during Purim to "blot out" Haman's name
Grogger (game), an online game developed to prevent drunk driving
Paula Grogger (1892-1984), Austrian writer

See also